Volodymyr Mikolayovich Sosiura (January 6, 1898, in Debaltseve, Yekaterinoslav Governorate (today Donetsk Oblast) of the Russian Empire – January 8, 1965, in Kyiv, Ukrainian SSR of the Soviet Union) was a Ukrainian lyric poet, writer, veteran of the Russian Civil War (1918–1920).

Brief biography
Volodymyr Sosiura was born in a settlement of Debaltseve train station (today city of Debaltseve).

He started to work in 1909 at the Donets Soda Factory in a settlement Verkhnee (today part of Lysychansk) where he worked for couple of years. In 1914–1918 he studied in an agricultural school (uchilische) in a settlement of Yama train station (today Siversk). In 1918 Sosiura was a member of the Donets Soda Factory insurgent workers group.

Sosiura fought in Petliura's Ukrainian People's Army (the 3rd Haidamaka Regiment that was quartered in Bakhmut) during the winter of 1918 to the autumn of 1919, before being taken prisoner by Denikin's Volunteer Army. He was sentenced to death, but managed to escape. Later, after the UPR was overrun, he joined the Red Army.

After the Russian Civil War in Ukraine ended (see Ukraine after Russian Revolution), he studied at the Artem Communist University in Kharkiv from 1922–23, then at the workers' faculty of the Public Education Institute (Kharkiv) from 1923-25. Sosiura belonged to the Ukrainian literary organizations Pluh, Hart, VAPLITE, and the All-Ukrainian Association of Proletarian Writers.

In the 1920s-30s Sosiura became very popular, but his ideological loyalties were torn between patriotic feelings for Ukraine and those for the Soviet Union and its often-changing ideologies. Even though he had long been a member of the CPU(b), he was frequently in conflict with it, and was twice expelled for "nationalistic undertones," he was even forced to undergo a "reeducation" at a factory in 1930-1931. Many of Sosiura's poems were not published.

In 1948 he was awarded the highest honors of the Stalin Prize, but then he came under harsh criticism for his poem entitled Love Ukraine (Любіть Україну), which was deemed too nationalistic in its tone by several Soviet news-media including Pravda. Afterwards his wife was arrested and spent six years in NKVD prisons. In 1963, he won the Shevchenko Prize for Swallows on the sun and Happiness of a working family.

Sosiura died in Kyiv at the age of 67.

Works
His works include numerous poems that vary from the patriotic genre to love poems such as Love Ukraine, The Late Summer (Babyne Lito), To Maria, Stalin, and many others.
For further reading refer here

Legacy
His portrait and title of his poem, Love Ukraine, are featured on a two Hryvnia collectible coin.

References

External links

 Poetry of Volodymyr Sosiura
 
 Volodymyr Sosiura at Encyclopedia of Ukraine
 Volodymyr Sosiura and the Oppressors of National Spirit By Ihor Siundiukov, The Day
  
 . Read by Basil Bucolic (YouTube)

1898 births
1965 deaths
Burials at Baikove Cemetery
People from Debaltseve
People from Yekaterinoslav Governorate
Ukrainian people in the Russian Empire
Ukrainian people of the Ukrainian–Soviet War
Soviet people of the Ukrainian–Soviet War
Communist Party of the Soviet Union members
Ukrainian poets
National University of Kharkiv alumni
Recipients of the Order of Lenin
Recipients of the Order of the Red Banner
Stalin Prize winners
Recipients of the Shevchenko National Prize